A57 could refer to:
 Benko Gambit, Encyclopaedia of Chess Openings code
 Sony Alpha 57, a DSLT camera
 ARM Cortex A57, a computer microprocessor architecture
 Bartini A-57, a 1957 supersonic strategic bomber project
 Chrysler A57 multibank, a Second World War tank engine

Roads 
 A57 road, a road connecting Liverpool and Lincoln in England
 A57 autoroute, a road connecting the Tunnel de Toulon to the A8 near Le Luc in France
 A57 motorway, a road connecting Goch and Köln in Germany
 A57 motorway, a road connecting Dolo and Quarto d'Altino in Italy
 A57 highway, a road connecting the autopista AP-9 and autovía A-52 and the airport of Vigo in Spain